Frieda Wishinsky (born July 14, 1948) is a German-born Canadian educator and author of children's books.

The daughter of Polish-Jewish parents, she was born in Munich and grew up in Manhattan. She received a BA in International Relations from City College of New York and a MSc Special Education from Ferkauf Graduate School. She has taught special education for children and adults in the United States, Israel and Canada. She now lives in Toronto.

Wishinsky's first book was Oonga Boonga (1990). Her work has been translated into French, German, Hungarian, Danish, Swedish, Dutch, Korean, Spanish and Catalan.

Selected work 
 Each One Special (1998) illustrated by Werner Zimmermann, shortlisted for a Governor General's Award
 Please, Louise! (2007) illustrated by Marie-Louise Gay, received the Marilyn Baillie Picture Book Award and the Ruth and Sylvia Schwartz Children’s Book Award
 Maggie Can't Wait (2009) illustrated by Dean Griffiths, received the Christie Harris Illustrated Children's Literature Prize
 You're Mean, Lily Jean (2009) illustrated by Kady MacDonald Denton, shortlisted for the Amelia Frances Howard-Gibbon Illustrator's Award
 Explorers Who Made It…or Died Trying (2011) illustrated by Bill Dickson
 Halifax Explodes (2011) illustrated by P. A. Lewis-MacDougall
Profiles: Freedom Heroines (2012) was named a top ten book for the Amelia Bloomer Book List in 2014
 A History of just About Everything (2013) with Elizabeth MacLeod, illustrated by Leng Qin, finalist for the Norma Fleck Award and was named a Best Book by the Bank Street Children's Book Committee
 Avis Dolphin (2015) illustrated by Willow Dawson, shortlisted for the Imperial Order Daughters of the Empire Canada Violet Downey Book Award

References

External links 
 

1948 births
Living people
Canadian women children's writers
People from Manhattan
German emigrants to Canada